Nindana is a village near Rohtak city in the Rohtak district of Haryana, India. It comes under the jurisdiction of Meham tehsil of Rohtak district. It is located on the Gohana to Bhiwani road. It is surrounded by Meham, Farmana, Bheran, Ajaib, Bainsi, Gugaheri, Kharak, and Girawad villages.

Notable persons

Villages in Rohtak district